Omari Joshua Curtis Patrick (born 24 May 1996) is an English professional footballer who plays for Carlisle United as a winger and forward. 

He trained at the FAB Academy and started his career in non-League with Beaconsfield SYCOB. He signed his first professional contract with Kidderminster Harriers and signed for his first EFL club with Barnsley, before moving to Bradford City a season later, where he made his Football League debut.

Early and personal life
Patrick was born in Slough. His father is a Commonwealth Games Gold-winning athlete, and his godfather is sprinter Linford Christie.

Career

Beaconsfield SYCOB
After leaving the FAB Academy, Patrick joined Beaconsfield SYCOB after having unsuccessful trials with Brentford, Barnet and Rangers. He scored on his debut against Bedford Town. Whilst at the club he scored 14 goals in 49 matches over one and a half seasons, and went on trial to Oxford United.

Kidderminster Harriers
On 5 December 2015, Patrick signed a contract with National League side Kidderminster Harriers. He made his debut from the bench on the same day, against Gateshead. At the end of the season, following Harriers' relegation and 18 appearances, Patrick was offered a new contract.

Barnsley
Following an impressive trial for Barnsley U23s, during which he scored against Ipswich Town U23s, he signed a one-year contract with the club on 21 September 2016. He was initially assigned to the development squad. He never made a first-team appearance for Barnsley.

Bradford City
He signed a one-year contract with Bradford City in May 2017. Following some "impressive" performances in pre-season friendlies, Patrick was praised by Bradford manager Stuart McCall. He started the first game of the 2017–18 season, scoring the winning goal. Following an "impressive start" to the season, Patrick signed a new three-year contract with the club in August 2017. He was dropped from the first-team halfway through the 2017–18 season, and also suffered a knee injury.

On 28 August 2018, Patrick joined League Two side Yeovil Town on loan until January 2019. His loan ended on 2 January 2019.

On 21 November 2019 he moved on loan to Wrexham, initially for one month. On 19 December the loan was extended for a second month. He returned to Bradford City at the end of his loan on 20 January 2020.

Carlisle United
Patrick signed an 18-month contract with Carlisle United on 31 January 2020.

Burton Albion
On 8 June 2021 it was announced that he would sign for Burton Albion on 1 July 2021, on a two-year contract.

Return to Carlisle United
On 6 January 2022, Patrick returned to Carlisle United on an 18-month contract. On 11 January 2022, Patrick joined Paul Baker, Paul Murray, and Hugh McIlmoyle as one of just four Carlisle players to score on his second permanent debut for the club.

Playing style
Patrick can play across the forward line as a striker or a winger. Upon his signing for Barnsley, Bobby Hassell said "he's quick and strong so he will be a dangerous asset in our attacking play. He is also very hard working off the ball, which is a very important and a valuable skill to have." He has been described by Bradford City Head of Recruitment Greg Abbott as being "lightning quick" and that he "runs in behind [the defence] and is good with both feet".

Career statistics

References

1996 births
Living people
Sportspeople from Slough
English footballers
Association football wingers
Association football forwards
Beaconsfield Town F.C. players
Kidderminster Harriers F.C. players
Barnsley F.C. players
Bradford City A.F.C. players
Yeovil Town F.C. players
Wrexham A.F.C. players
Carlisle United F.C. players
Burton Albion F.C. players
Southern Football League players
National League (English football) players
English Football League players
Footballers from Berkshire